Bohdan Yevhenovych Butko (born 13 January 1991) is a  Ukrainian footballer who plays as a right-back.

Club career

Early life and career
Butko was born in Kostiantynivka, in the Donetsk Oblast and went to the youth academy of his local club Shakhtar Donetsk. Upon completion of the school, Butko was promoted first to Shakhtar-3 Donetsk of the Ukrainian Second League, followed by the Shakhtar reserves, where he would spend three seasons.

Professional career
He went on loan to Volyn Lutsk in Ukrainian Premier League on 16 July 2010. He would go on to play 27 league games and score three goals for them in the 2010–11 season.

In the 2011–12 season, he went on loan to FC Illichivets Mariupol of the Ukrainian Premier League.

Honours

National football team
Ukraine Under-19
UEFA European Under-19 Championship: 2009

Club
Shakhtar
Ukrainian Premier League: 2016–17, 2017–18, 2018–19
Ukrainian Cup: 2016–17, 2017–18, 2018–19
Ukrainian Super Cup: 2017

Career statistics

Club

International

Personal life
In October 2021, Butko published homophobic remarks in his Instagram account directed at Josh Cavallo and his supporters.

References

External links

Ukrainian footballers
People from Kostiantynivka
Ukraine youth international footballers
Ukraine under-21 international footballers
Ukraine international footballers
FC Shakhtar-3 Donetsk players
FC Shakhtar Donetsk players
FC Volyn Lutsk players
FC Mariupol players
Ukrainian Premier League players
Ukrainian expatriate footballers
Expatriate footballers in Russia
FC Amkar Perm players
Russian Premier League players
Association football defenders
1991 births
Living people
UEFA Euro 2012 players
Ukrainian expatriate sportspeople in Russia
UEFA Euro 2016 players
Lech Poznań players
Ekstraklasa players
Expatriate footballers in Poland
Ukrainian expatriate sportspeople in Poland
Büyükşehir Belediye Erzurumspor footballers
Süper Lig players
Expatriate footballers in Turkey
Ukrainian expatriate sportspeople in Turkey
Sportspeople from Donetsk Oblast